This is a listing of the horses that finished in either first, second, or third place and the number of starters in the Maryland Racing Media Stakes, an American stakes race for fillies and mares three years-old and up at one and one eighth miles on dirt held at Laurel Park Racecourse in Laurel, Maryland.  (List 1992-present)

See also 
 Maryland Racing Media Stakes 
 Laurel Park Racecourse

References 

 The Gallorette Handicap at Pedigree Query

Laurel Park Racecourse